August Wilhelm Heye (31 January 1869, Fulda – 11 March 1947, Braunlage) was a German officer who rose to the rank of Generaloberst and became head of the Army Command within the Ministry of the Reichswehr in the Weimar Republic. One of his sons was admiral Hellmuth Heye.

Biography
The son of a Prussian officer, Heye joined the Army in 1888 and subsequently became a member of the German General Staff. During the First World War, he served on both the East and Western fronts, eventually becoming the last chief of the operations department at the Oberste Heeresleitung (Supreme Army Command). After the end of the war, he assisted Hans von Seeckt in organising the new Reichswehr, serving as the second Chief of the Truppenamt and later commander of the Wehrkreis I (Military District I). In 1926, he replaced Seeckt as Chief of Army Command and held that position until retiring in 1930.

Decorations and awards
 Iron Cross of 1914, 1st and 2nd class
 Knight's Cross of the Royal House Order of Hohenzollern with Swords
 Pour le Mérite (20 August 1916) with oak leaves (3 April 1918)
 Order of the Red Eagle, 4th class with Swords (Prussia)
 Order of the Crown, 3rd class (Prussia)
 Service Award (Prussia)
 Commander of the Cross of Honor of the House Order of Hohenzollern with swords
 Officer's Cross of the Military Merit Order with Swords (Bavaria)
 Knight's Cross, First Class of the Albert Order with swords (Saxony)
 Commander of the Military Merit Order (Württemberg)
 Commander, Second Class of the Friedrich Order with Swords (Württemberg)
 Hanseatic Cross of Hamburg
 War Merit Cross, 2nd class (Brunswick)
 Commander of the House and Merit Order of Peter Frederick Louis with swords and laurel (Oldenburg)
 Friedrich August Cross, 1st and 2nd class (Oldenburg)
 Cross for Merit in War (Saxe-Meiningen)
 War Merit Cross (Lippe)
 Hanseatic Cross of Lübeck
 Commander of the Order of Leopold with war decoration (Austria)
 Order of the Iron Crown, 2nd class with War Decoration (Austria)
 Military Merit Cross, 2nd class with War Decoration (Austria-Hungary)
 Order of Osmanieh, 2nd class with Swords
 Silver Liakat Medal with swords
 Gallipoli Star ("Iron Crescent", Ottoman Empire)
 Grand Officer of the Order of Military Merit (Bulgaria)
 Wehrmacht Long Service Award, 4th to 1st class.

Notes

External links
 

1869 births
1947 deaths
People from Fulda
German Army personnel of World War I
Colonel generals of the Reichswehr
Recipients of the Pour le Mérite (military class)
Recipients of the Hanseatic Cross (Lübeck)
Recipients of the Silver Liakat Medal
Grand Officers of the Order of Military Merit (Bulgaria)
Prussian Army personnel
People from Hesse-Nassau